Mendes is the Greek name for the ancient Egyptian city of Djedet.

Mendes may also refer to:

Cândido Mendes, Maranhão, a city in Brazil
Mendes (name), a Portuguese surname
Mendes, Rio de Janeiro, a municipality in Rio de Janeiro, Brazil
Benveniste/Mendes family were prominent in 11th to 15th century France, Portugal and Spain.

See also
Mendez (disambiguation)
Mendis (disambiguation)
Mentes (disambiguation)
Menderes (disambiguation)